Maria Strandlund (born 17 August 1969) is a former professional tennis player from Sweden. She competed in the Fed Cup from 1988 to 2000.

WTA career finals

Doubles 2 (1 title, 1 runner-up)

ITF finals

Singles (1–4)

Doubles (10–8)

References

1969 births
Living people
Swedish female tennis players